Cnephasia nesiotica is a species of moth of the family Tortricidae. It is found on the Canary Islands.

The wingspan is about 18 mm. The forewings are pale brownish cream, mixed with white and sprinkled with brownish. The pattern is brownish with ochreous shading costally and suffused with brown dorsally. The hindwings are pale brownish grey.

References

Moths described in 1983
nesiotica